The dancesport competitions at the 2001 World Games in Akita was played between 25 and 26 August. 94 dancers, from 26 nations, participated in the tournament. The dancesport competition took place at Akita City Gymnasium.

Participating nations

Medal table

Events

References

External links
 World DanceSport Federation
 Dancesport on IWGA website
 Results

 
2001 World Games
World Games
2001